Moshood Olalekan Balogun (born 18 October 1942) is a Nigerian monarch. He is the 42nd Olubadan of Ibadan.

Birth
Moshood Olalekan Balogun was born on 18 October 1942 in Ali-Iwo compound, present day Ibadan North East Local Government Area of Oyo State, Nigeria.

Education
He travelled to the U.K., where he studied for his O and A levels certificates while doing a part-time job to sustain himself. Upon completion of his O and A levels program, Lekan Balogun proceeded to the Brunel University. He left the university in 1973 with a master's degree in Administration and Economics. He then had a brief stint with the Lambeth Local Government Social Services Department, where he worked for one-and-a-half years after which his academic inclination took the better of him and he enrolled for his PhD.

Career
Lekan Balogun was a presidential aspirant on the platform of Social Democratic Party (S.D.P.); he was also a gubernatorial candidate for the People's Democratic Party (P.D.P.) in Oyo State in the present political dispensation. In addition to this, he was a senator of the Federal Republic of Nigeria in the Fourth Republic.

Lekan Balogun represented Oyo Central senatorial district between 1999 and 2003. As a senator, he was chairman of the Senate Committee on National Planning and was a member of many Senate Committees such as Appropriations, Security and Intelligence, Police Affairs and Defence (Army).

Balogun had earlier worked as a lecturer at Ahmadu Bello University, Zaria, Kaduna State, an editor of the monthly magazine The Nigerian Pathfinder, and as a director with Triumph Newspaper, Kano, as well as a management consultant for multinational Organisations such as Leyland, Exiat Battery, and Nigerian Breweries.

He worked with Shell British Petroleum Company where he rose to the position of the Administrator/Head, Industrial Relations, Recruitment and Scholarships, Planning and Development units.

He has written and published widely. Many of his publications include: 
 A Review of Nigeria's 4 years’ Development Plan, 1970–1974;
 Social Justice or Doom;
 Power for Sale;
 Arrogance of Power.

Balogun, who was the Otun Olubadan of Ibadanland (one of the two most senior chiefs in Ibadanland), was crowned the 42nd Olubadan of Ibadanland by Governor Seyi Makinde of Oyo State on 11 March 2022.

Personal life

Lekan Balogun is a Muslim and is married to two wives with children.

References

Members of the Senate (Nigeria)
Social Democratic Party (Nigeria) politicians
Nigerian traditional rulers
1942 births
Living people